Tower Grove Park is a municipal park in St. Louis, Missouri. Located on the south side of the city, the elongated  park extends  from Kingshighway Boulevard east to Grand Boulevard. The park’s predominately residential surroundings include the neighborhoods of Southwest Garden, Shaw, Tower Grove East, and Tower Grove South.

Both Tower Grove Park and the neighboring Missouri Botanical Garden were part of the estate of 19th-century businessman and botanist Henry Shaw. In 1868, Shaw donated the land for the park to the city of St. Louis.

Environment and facilities
The park features 32 pavilions of picturesque design, most dating from the Victorian era. The landscape includes a lily pond and formal plantings; the Piper Palm House, a bandstand, the site of music and other special events; as well as tennis courts; a wading pool for small children; open expanses of green; softball diamonds and soccer fields; paths for walkers, joggers, and cyclists, and tall specimen trees and a great variety of bushes. Designed in the gardenesque style by James Gurney Sr., the park has been designated a National Historic Landmark as one of the nation's finest examples of a late 19th-century public park. Gurney had been head of the aquatic plants section at Kew Gardens in London, and he remained in St. Louis as superintendent of the park.

The park is home to nearly 400 species of trees, bushes, and flowering plants. It is a well-known birdwatching area, particularly during the spring and fall bird migration seasons. It is part of the Mississippi Flyway and migrating birds rest in the park along their journey. Forty percent of North American songbirds and waterbirds use this route. Examples are many types of warblers, orioles, and Canada geese.

Statues

There are several statues from the 1800s along the central corridor of the park. There is a full likeness of Alexander von Humboldt, the German naturalist, geographer and explorer, and one of William Shakespeare the English playwright, both from 1878 and sculpted by German sculptor Ferdinand Freiherr von Miller.  von Miller also produced a statue of the Italian navigator and explorer Christopher Columbus that was dedicated in 1886, and placed near the gates and entrance from Grand Avenue.

The Christopher Columbus statue had been annually commemorated by the local Italian American community. In 2016 and 2017, the statue was vandalized with red paint and messages including "murderer" and "Black Lives Matter." Calls for the statue's removal in 2018 initiated forming a commission to make recommendations on the statue's future. The Columbus statue was removed from the park in June 2020.

Around the bandstand there are white marble busts of some famous musical composers mounted on columns. Mozart and Rossini by Howard Kretschmar from 1882, Beethoven and Wagner by Ferdinand von Miller from 1884, and Gounod and Verdi by Carlo Nicoli from 1886.

There is a smaller scale statue of Friedrich Wilhelm von Steuben, the German born military officer and American Revolution volunteer, near the Palm house. Steuben later became an American citizen and figure to German Americans. The original, larger statue (by the German sculptor Cuno von Uechtritz-Steinkirch) was commissioned for the 1904 World's Fair. The current version was placed in Tower Grove Park in 1968.

Two zinc statues of stags, en couchant and on pedestals, face each other across Center Cross Drive, just west of the Piper Palm House.

Events
Many events, from picnics to weddings, are held in the park throughout the year. During the summer, a number of large festivals are held in the park, including ones featuring themes such as international culture and paganism. The park has also been the site of various LGBTQ Pride festivals.

Since 2005, from May through October, a farmers' market is held from 8-12:30 Saturday mornings just west of the Wading Pool Pavilion. It features local and organic farmers offering fresh produce and meats, baked goods and preserves, as well as prepared foods and drinks, teas and coffees, with stalls for craftsmen and artisans as well.

Photos of pavilions

See also
 Forest Park, the largest park in the city, located to the northwest, and site of the 1904 World's Fair
 Gazebo
 Lafayette Park, the first public park west of the Mississippi, in the old city to the northeast
 List of National Historic Landmarks in Missouri
 National Register of Historic Places listings in St. Louis south and west of downtown

References

 
 
Master Plan of Tower Grove Park, 1985 by Eldridge Lovelace

External links 
 Tower Grove Park, Official Website
 Missouri Botanical Garden, Official Website

National Register of Historic Places in St. Louis
Municipal parks in Missouri
Parks in Missouri
Arboreta in Missouri
National Historic Landmarks in Missouri
Parks in St. Louis
Urban public parks
Tourist attractions in St. Louis
Parks on the National Register of Historic Places in Missouri
1889 establishments in Missouri